Emporia USD 253 is a public unified school district headquartered in Emporia, Kansas, United States.  The district includes the communities of Emporia, Plymouth, and nearby rural areas.

Administration
Emporia Public Schools is currently led by Superintendent Allison Anderson-Harder.

Board of Education
The Emporia Board of Education is currently under the leadership of President Michael Crouch and Vice President Leslie Seeley. Other board members include Grant Riles, Doug Epp, Jeremy Dorsey, Art Gutierrez, Melissa Ogleby, Leslie Seeley, and Michael Crouch. The board meets on the second and fourth Wednesdays, of each month, at Mary Herbert Education Office (District office).

Schools
The school district operates the following schools:

Secondary schools:
 Emporia High School
 Emporia Middle School

Primary schools:
 Logan Avenue Elementary School
 Riverside Elementary School
 Timmerman Elementary School
 Village Elementary School
 William Allen White Elementary School
 Walnut Elementary School

Early childhood:
 Jones Early Childhood Development Center

Other:
 Turning Point Academy - no longer active
 Flint Hills Learning Center
 Village elementary has 2 indoor gardens were there are fish turtles and banana trees.

See also
 Kansas State Department of Education
 Kansas State High School Activities Association
 List of high schools in Kansas
 List of unified school districts in Kansas

References

External links
 

School districts in Kansas
Education in Lyon County, Kansas
Educational institutions established in 1863
Emporia, Kansas